Museum District Station is a station on the METRO Red Line in Houston, Texas (USA). It serves the Houston Museum District.

The Museum District station is the only METRORail station where northbound and southbound trains each have their own platforms on opposite one-way, parallel streets. The station platforms are on Fannin Street for southbound trains, and San Jacinto Street for northbound trains, and both platforms are near their intersections with Binz Street.

References

METRORail stations
Railway stations in the United States opened in 2004
2004 establishments in Texas
Railway stations in Harris County, Texas